Qiyun Woo is a Singaporean environmental activist, content creator, climate activist and artist. Woo also serves as a Sustainability Consultant with the Unravel Carbon and also an author at Green is the New Black.

Early life and education 
Woo was born in 1997 in Singapore. She attained a Bachelor of Environmental Studies from the National University of Singapore (NUS).

Career 
Woo worked as the community lead at the Green is the New Black. Woo then worked at the Economic Development Board as an Associate then as a Senior Associate. Woo subsequent worked with Deloitee as a Risk Advisory Consultant. Woo currently works with Unravel Carbon as a Sustainability Consultant and is also an Author with Green is the New Black.

Activism 
Woo started her Environmental Activism Journey at the age of nine when she penned a three-page essay when Australian zookeeper and television personality Steve Irwin died after being pierced by a stingray barb in 2006. She started the page @theweirdandwild on Instagram to communicate the issues with the environment in Singapore. Woo together with Sammie Ng started the White Monday Movement to tackle mindless consumerism by urging people to purchase only what they need. Woo  is currently building Climate Commons, a climate communications platform with interactive media elements.

Awards 
Woo was awarded the FASS Student Leadership Award by the NUS in 2019. In 2018, She attained the HSBC/NYAA Environmental Youth Award. Woo has also participated in numerous sustainability related competitions such as the Singapore Frontier Challenge held by National University of Singapore, the SembCorp Green Wave 2018 competition, and the CDL E-generation Competition 2018. Woo is also an Women in Environment and Sustainability (WISE) Champion.

References 

Living people
1997 births
Singaporean environmentalists
Singaporean women environmentalists
National University of Singapore alumni
Deloitte people
Singaporean artists
Singaporean women artists
Youth climate activists